Carl Ray St.Clair (born June 5, 1952) is an American conductor.

Early life and education 
Born in Hochheim, Texas, St.Clair went to school in Yoakum, Texas, and graduated from Yoakum High School. He attended the University of Texas and later studied conducting with Gustav Meier at the University of Michigan and Leonard Bernstein at Tanglewood. He, was music director of the Ann Arbor Symphony Orchestra (Michigan) from 1985 to 1992, and of the Cayuga Chamber Orchestra (Ithaca, New York) from 1986 to 1991. Beginning in 1986, he was an assistant conductor with the Boston Symphony Orchestra. In 1990, he was a recipient of the Seaver/National Endowment for the Arts Conductors Award. St.Clair has served on the faculty of Southern Illinois University Edwardsville.

Success as a conductor 
In January 1990, he conducted the Pacific Symphony for the first time. On the success of that appearance, he was named the orchestra's music director, a position he still holds. During his Pacific Symphony tenure, he and the orchestra have commissioned and recorded several works, including Richard Danielpour's An American Requiem (Reference Recordings) and Elliot Goldenthal's Fire Water Paper: A Vietnam Oratorio (Sony Classical) with cellist Yo-Yo Ma. Other recordings include "Radiant Voices" and "Postcard" by composer in residence Frank Ticheli (Koch International Classics), and the two piano concertos of Lukas Foss (harmonia mundi). The orchestra and St.Clair host an annual festival of American composers, including "Uncharted Beauty: The Music of Lou Harrison" (2005–2006), "Los Sonidos de México" (2006–2007), and "The West — Music inspired by the American Frontier" (2007–2008).

In Europe, St.Clair was the principal guest conductor of the Radio-Sinfonieorchester Stuttgart from 1998 to 2004, where his work included a three–year recording project of the Villa–Lobos symphonies. He became Generalmusikdirektor (General Music Director, or GMD) of the Staatskapelle Weimar in 2005, a post he held for three years. In 2008 he took up the post of GMD of the Komische Oper Berlin, with an initial contract of six years, but in May 2010 he resigned effective with the end of the 2009/10 season.

In 2012, St.Clair was appointed to Principal Conductor and Artistic Leader of the Thornton Symphony Orchestra at the University of Southern California's Thornton School of Music.  

St.Clair has worked on the creation and implementation of various symphony education programs, including "Classical Connections", "arts-X–press" and "Class Act". In 2006, he worked with the German Bundesjugendorchester (National Youth Orchestra).

Personal life
St.Clair and his wife Susan live in Laguna Beach, California, with their three children.

References

External links
 Komische Oper Berlin English-language biography
 Pacific Symphony biography
 Staatskapelle Weimar German-language biography
 Profile, Schmidt Artists International

American male conductors (music)
20th-century American conductors (music)
21st-century American conductors (music)
University of Texas at Austin College of Fine Arts alumni
University of Michigan School of Music, Theatre & Dance alumni
Southern Illinois University faculty
USC Thornton School of Music faculty
1952 births
Living people
People from DeWitt County, Texas
People from Laguna Beach, California
Classical musicians from Texas
20th-century American male musicians
21st-century American male musicians